Maya Gallus is a Canadian documentary filmmaker, and co-founder of Red Queen Productions with Justine Pimlott. Her films have screened at international film festivals, including Toronto International Film Festival, Montreal World Film Festival, Hot Docs Canadian International Documentary Festival, Sheffield Doc/Fest, SEOUL International Women’s Film Festival, Singapore International Film Festival, This Human World Film Festival (Vienna) and Women Make Waves (Taiwan), among others. Her work has also screened at the Museum of Fine Arts (Boston), Donostia Kultura, San Sebastián and Canada House UK, as well as theatrically in Tokyo, San Francisco, Key West and Toronto, and been broadcast around the world. She has won numerous awards, including a Gemini Award for Best Direction for Girl Inside, and has been featured in The Guardian, UK; Ms. (Magazine), Curve (Magazine), Bust (Magazine), Salon (Magazine), POV and The Walrus, among others.  She is a Director/Writer alumna of the Canadian Film Centre and a participant in Women in the Director’s Chair. She will be honoured with a "Focus On" retrospective at the 2017 Hot Docs festival.

Filmography

Awards and nominations

Atlantic Film Festival 
1997:  Best Narration: Elizabeth Smart: On The Side of the Angels		

Gemini Awards 
1992: Best Direction in a Documentary - Elizabeth Smart: On The Side of the Angels (Nomination)

Genie Awards
1998: Best Documentary: Erotica: A Journey Into Female Sexuality (Nomination)

Hot Docs
1998: Best Arts Documentary: Erotica: A Journey Into Female Sexuality (Nomination)

Yorkton Film Festival, Golden Sheaf Awards
1991: Best Production: Elizabeth Smart: On The Side of the Angels (Award)
1991: Best Documentary: Elizabeth Smart: On The Side of the Angels (Award)
1991: Best Editing: Elizabeth Smart: On The Side of the Angels (Award)

For additional awards - see Red Queen Productions

References

External links
 
 
  Maya Gallus at Women Make Movies
  Maya Gallus at Cinema Politica
 Maya Gallus at Media Queer

Canadian women film directors
Canadian documentary film directors
Canadian documentary film producers
Living people
Canadian Film Centre alumni
Year of birth missing (living people)
20th-century Canadian LGBT people
LGBT film directors
LGBT producers
Canadian women film producers
Canadian women documentary filmmakers
21st-century Canadian LGBT people